Madhwanama is a special composition on Madhvacharya (kulaguru of madhvas) which is written by Sripadaraja.

Significance
Madhvanama tells about the three avataras of our lord Mukyaprana (vayu): Mukhyaprana, Hanuman, Bhima and Madhvacharya

Sections

Mukhyaprana
He is the moolarupra (main rupa of vayu) and the one who gives support to the entire universe. there are 4 stanzas praising Mukhyaprana in this section.

Hanuman
Hanuman is the first Avatara of Mukhyaprana/Vayu. He was born in Treta Yuga and was a great devotee of lord Rama. And helped lord rama till how much he could. There are 7 stanzas praising lord Hanuman in this section.

Bhima
Bhima was the strongest of all in Dvapara Yuga. He was one of the pandavas. He killed many bad demons. There are 11 stanzas praising Bhima in this section.

Madhvacharya
Lord Vayu took his third avatara as Madhvacharya in Kali Yuga. He is the main and the greatest Guru (teacher) of the madhwas (followers of the dvaita siddhanta). There are 7 stanzas praising Madhvacharya in this section.

Phalastuti
This section tells us the virtues (benefits) of reciting Madhva Nama. THe Phalastuti is written by the great poet Jagannatha dasa. there are 3 stanzas in this section

References

External links 
 The Complete lyrics of Madhva nama and its introduction
 Madhwanama by Sri Sripadarajaru
 Madhwanama(ಮಧ್ವನಾಮ)
 Introduction to Madhva Nama

Hindu music
Hindu devotional songs
Kannada-language songs